The Elm Grange, also known as Evergreen Acres, was a historic home located near Odessa, New Castle County, Delaware.  It was built about 1840, and was a -story, five-bay, L-shaped brick dwelling with a two-story rear wing.  It had a center hall plan. It had a gable roof with dormers and the front facade featured a tetra-style porch with fluted columns.

It was listed on the National Register of Historic Places in 1985. The house was demolished between 2007 and 2009.

References

Houses on the National Register of Historic Places in Delaware
Houses completed in 1840
Houses in New Castle County, Delaware
National Register of Historic Places in New Castle County, Delaware